

Qualifying criteria
A total of 260 athletes will be competing in the weightlifting events at the 2008 Summer Olympics in Beijing, People's Republic of China.

Host nation
The host nation shall directly qualify 6 men's and 4 women's places.

World championships
NOCs will achieve qualification places according to their position in the joint team classification by points adding those scored in the 2006 and in the 2007 World Championships, whereby points achieved in the 2007 World Championships team classification must be multiplied by 1.2.

Men:
 1st to 6th - 6 athletes
 7th to 13th - 5 athletes
 14th to 20th - 4 athletes
 21st to 27th - 3 athletes

Women:
 1st to 9th - 4 athletes
 10th to 14th - 3 athletes
 15th to 17th - 2 athletes

Continental championships
Continental qualification events will be held for each continent, at which only NOCs which have not gained qualification places in the 2006 and 2007 World Championships may win qualification places.

Men:
Africa:
 1st - 2 athletes
 2nd to 4th - 1 athlete
America:
 1st to 2nd - 2 athletes
 3rd to 5th - 1 athlete
Asia:
 1st to 2nd - 2 athletes
 3rd to 5th - 1 athlete
Europe:
 1st to 2nd - 2 athletes
 3rd to 5th - 1 athlete
Oceania:
 1st - 2 athletes
 2nd to 3rd - 1 athlete

Women:
Africa:
 1st to 3rd - 1 athlete
America:
 1st to 4th - 1 athlete
Asia:
 1st to 4th - 1 athlete
Europe:
 1st - 2 athletes
 2nd to 3rd - 1 athlete
Oceania:
 1st to 3rd - 1 athlete

Individual qualification
15 places (8 for men and 7 for women) will be allocated based on the Olympic Qualification Ranking List established by 31 May 2008. Individual qualification places will be allocated to the athletes, ranked in the top 15 places (men), or top 10 places (women) in each bodyweight category, from NOCs which have not gained any qualification places through the 2006 and 2007 World Championships or Continental Qualification Events. Individual Qualification is attributed by name to the respective athlete, who may participate in the Olympic Games only in the same weight category in which he achieved the qualification place. An NOC may qualify a maximum of 1 (one) male and 1 (one) female weightlifter under the criteria of individual qualification. Should more than 1 (one) athlete from an NOC achieve qualification under these criteria, the NOC must determine which place will be used.

Tripartite commission
The Tripartite Commission shall, on the basis of requests submitted by the NOCs and in consultation, allocate a total of 10 (ten) Invitation places to NOCs, in a gender proportion of approximately 6 (six) men and 4 (four) women.

Reallocation of unused quotas
If an NOC chooses not to use all qualification places obtained, or if individual qualification places cannot be allocated, the qualification places concerned shall be reallocated by the IWF with consideration to the Olympic Qualification Ranking List.

Qualification timeline

Qualifiers

Men

Women

Individual qualification

Tripartite commission invitations and reallocation of unused quotas

References
 Olympic Qualification by NOC
2006 & 2007 World Championships Men Women
 Entries per weight category (Women)
 Entries per weight category (Men)

Qualification for the 2008 Summer Olympics